This is a list of notable active non-governmental organizations of national minorities, indigenous and diasporas.

International
Assembly of French Citizens Abroad
Inuit Circumpolar Council
World Jewish Congress

Africa

Heal The World Movement Nigeria

Unified Technology & Agricultural Program (UTAPAFRICA)

Asia

Israel
A New Dawn in the Negev
Adalah – The Legal Center for Arab Minority Rights in Israel

India
All India Muslim Personal Law Board

Pakistan
Hare Rama Foundation Pakistan

Europe

Continental
European Centre for Minority Issues
European Jewish Congress
High Commissioner on National Minorities
Minority Rights Group International

Austria
The World Congress of the Nations of Georgia

Belarus
Union of Poles in Belarus
Yad Yisroel

Belgium
European Roma Information Office

Bulgaria
NGO Roma Together

Croatia
Alliance of Roma in the Republic of Croatia "Kali Sara"
Association for Serbian language and literature in the Republic of Croatia
Serb Democratic Forum
Serb National Council
Privrednik
Prosvjeta

Czech Republic
Congress of Poles in the Czech Republic
International Romani Union

France
Conseil Représentatif des Institutions juives de France

Germany
Central Council of Jews in Germany
Congress of Polonia in Germany
Union of Poles in Germany

Hungary
European Roma Rights Centre

Lithuania
Association of Poles in Lithuania
Kaunas Cultural Centre of Various Nations

Poland
Kashubian-Pomeranian Association
Kaszëbskô Jednota

Macedonia
Nansen Dialogue Centre Skopje

Romania
Romani CRISS

Russia
Congress of the Jewish Religious Organizations and Associations in Russia
Federation of Jewish Communities of Russia
Federation of Jewish Communities of the CIS
Russian Jewish Congress

Serbia
Bosniac National Council
Croat National Council
Department for culture of Croats of Vojvodina

Slovakia
Forum Minority Research Institute

Ukraine
Association of Polish Culture of the Lviv Land
Russian Cultural Centre (Lviv)

United Kingdom
Board of Deputies of British Jews
British Tamil Association
Federation of Poles in Great Britain
Jewish Community Centre for London
Jewish Lads' and Girls' Brigade
Jewish Leadership Council
London Jewish Forum
Russian Cultural Centre (London)
Scottish Council of Jewish Communities
Worldwide Somali Students & Professionals

North America

Canada
Assembly of First Nations
Association of United Ukrainian Canadians
Bavarian Schuhplattlers of Edmonton
Canadian Polish Congress
Congress of Aboriginal Peoples
National Congress of Italian Canadians

United States
Albanian American Civic League
Alpha Phi Alpha fraternity
Alpha Kappa Alpha
American Polish Advisory Council
Anti-Defamation League
Armenian Youth Federation
Armenian National Institute
Chechnya Advocacy Network
Croatian Fraternal Union
Cultural Survival
German-American Heritage Foundation of the USA
German American National Congress
Irish American Cultural Institute
Mexican American Political Association
Mexicans Without Borders
National Association of Arab-Americans
National Congress of American Indians
National Iranian American Council
National Latino Congreso
National Pan-Hellenic Council
Organization of Istanbul Armenians
Polish American Association
Polish American Catholic Heritage Committee
Polish Culture Society of Edmonton
Polish National Alliance
Polish Women's Alliance
Serbian Unity Congress
Ukrainian Congress Committee of America
Voice of Roma

South America

Bolivia
Confederation of Indigenous Peoples of Bolivia

Brazil
Coordination of the Indigenous Organizations of the Brazilian Amazon

Ecuador
Confederation of Indigenous Nationalities of Ecuador
Confederation of Indigenous Nationalities of the Ecuadorian Amazon

Peru
Coordinator of Indigenous Organizations of the Amazon River Basin
Interethnic Association for the Development of the Peruvian Rainforest

Australia and Oceania

Australia
Executive Council of Australian Jewry

References

Non-governmental organizations of national minorities
Diaspora organizations
Minorities